Black House is a 2007 South Korean horror film directed by Shin Tae-ra, that is based on the popular Japanese novel of the same title (called Kuroi Ie) by Yusuke Kishi. A Japanese film adaptation of the novel was released in 1999. The story centers on an insurance investigator that suspects a family murdered their son to receive his insurance policy.

Plot
During his first day as an insurance investigator, Jeon Joon-oh, receives a phone call from a lady enquiring if a life insurance policy could be collected if someone commits suicide. A few days later Joon-oh is asked to personally come to the home of an insurance policy holder.

When Joon-oh arrives at their home he is greeted by a grim man. They talk for a little while, before the father asks the insurance agent to go into their son's room and have a talk with him. When the insurance agent opens the son's door he finds the boy hanging from a noose, dead from an apparent suicide.

The father then shows up at Joon-oh's office and asks for the money pertaining to his son's life insurance policy. Joon-oh is suspicious of the man and tells him he has to wait until the coroner's report comes in. The man becomes furious and then leaves. The father returns the next day and the next day and the next day. Finally Joon-oh's boss decides to pay the man his son's life insurance policy. Joon-oh's life doesn't return to normal and in fact descends further downward because of a stalker that may well be the insurance policy holder that they just paid off.

Cast
Hwang Jung-min as Jeon Joon-oh, an insurance investigator
Yoo Sun as Shin Yi-hwa
Kang Shin-il as Park Choong-bae
Kim Seo-hyung as Jang Mi-na
Kim Jeong-seok as Chief Nam
Yoo Seung-mok as Ma Yong-sik
Jung In-gi as police detective Oh
 Kim Young-sun as Hong-yeon's mother

See also
List of South Korean films of 2007

References

External links

Black House at Naver 
Black House at Cine 21 

2007 horror films
2000s horror thriller films
South Korean slasher films
South Korean horror thriller films
South Korean detective films
Horror film remakes
South Korean remakes of Japanese films
Films based on Japanese novels
Films based on horror novels
Films directed by Shin Tae-ra
CJ Entertainment films
2000s South Korean films